The Adnyamathanha language (pronounced ), also known as  yura ngarwala  and other names, and Kuyani, also known as Guyani and other variants, are two closely related Australian Aboriginal languages. They are traditional languages of the Adnyamathanha of and the Kuyani peoples, of the Flinders Ranges and to the west of the Flinders respectively, in South Australia.

As of the 2016 Australian census, there were around 140 speakers of Adnyamathanha, making it an endangered language; there have been no speakers of Kuyani recorded since 1975. The first bilingual dictionary of the language was published in November 2020.

The name of the witchetty grub comes from Adnyamathanha.

Classification
While R. M. W. Dixon classifies Adnyamathanha and Guyani as a single language, Ethnologue, Glottolog and AIATSIS treats them as separate languages, L10: Adnyamathanha and L9: Kuyani.

Speakers
Estimates of the number of people who speak Adnyamathanha are variable, though it is a severely endangered language. According to Oates (1973) there were only 30 speakers, around 20 according to Schmidt in 1990, 127 in the 1996 Australian census, and about 140 counted in the 2016 census.

Grammar
Adnyamathanha has a complex system of personal pronouns. There are 10 different ways of saying we "you and I" (first person dual), depending on the relationship between the speaker and the addressee.

First dictionary (2020)
The linguist Bernhard Schebeck travelled to the Nepabunna region in the 1970s, and wrote An Adnyamathanha-English Research Dictionary in 2000, which was "For private, or internal, use only – not for publication".  Dorothy Tunbridge, a linguist from Canberra and author of Flinders Ranges Dreaming visited the area in the 1980s. Both contributed much to knowledge of the language, but neither recorded all of the words that were known to local speakers.

In November 2020 the first-ever bilingual Adnyamathanha/English dictionary and grammar was published, with translations from and to each language. Compiled by Terrence Coulthard and his wife Josephine, the 400-page Adnyamathanha Culture Guide and Language Book includes descriptions of cultural practices, songlines (muda), the Adnyamathanha kinship system and social history. Terrence, an Adnyamathanha speaker, had been collecting information on the culture and language for 40 years, building on the earlier work by Schebeck and Tunbridge. Linguists and others from Adelaide University's Mobile Language Team helped the couple to finalise work on the book in the 18 months to two years before publication.

The Coulthards run Iga Warta, a cultural tourism enterprise, located near Nepabunna in the Gammon Ranges, the site of a mission where Terrence grew up. Iga Warta means "native orange", named by 19th-century English botanist John Lindley as Capparis mitchelii.

Words

Traditionally it is rare for men to dig for them. Witchetty grubs feature as Dreamings in many Aboriginal paintings.
muda – songline

Names
This language has been known by many names and variant spellings of names, including:
Adnyamathanha, Adynyamathanha, Adjnjamathanha, Atʸnʸamat̪an̪a, Adnjamathanha, Adnyamathana, Anyamathana, Ad'n'amadana, Anjimatana, Anjiwatana, Unyamootha
Wailpi, Wailbi, Waljbi, Wipie, the name of a dialect
Archualda
Benbakanjamata
Binbarnja
Gadjnjamada, Kanjimata, Keydnjmarda
Jandali
Mardala
Nimalda
Nuralda
Umbertana
Yura ngarwala

 is a widely used term for the Adnyamathanha language. It translates literally to 'people speak'. However, in modern times  has come to mean 'Adnyamathanha person', rather than 'person' generally, and thus the term translates to 'Adnyamathanha person speak'.

Guyani is also spelled Kijani, Kuyani, Kwiani.

Phonology
Adjnjamathanha and Guyani have the same phonemic inventory.

Vowels

Consonants
Most of the nasals and laterals are allophonically prestopped.

History
While the closely related Guyani retains word-initial stops, Adnyamathanha has undergone systematic lenition of stops in this position. Former  has become , former  and probably also  have become , and former  has disappeared entirely.

Notes

References

External links
 Bibliography of Adnyamathanha resources, at the Australian Institute of Aboriginal and Torres Strait Islander Studies

Thura-Yura languages
Endangered indigenous Australian languages in South Australia
Severely endangered languages